The golden-chevroned tanager (Thraupis ornata) is a species of bird in the family Thraupidae.
It is endemic to Brazil.

Its natural habitats are subtropical or tropical moist lowland forest, subtropical or tropical moist montane forest, and heavily degraded former forest.

References

golden-chevroned tanager
Birds of the Atlantic Forest
Endemic birds of Brazil
golden-chevroned tanager
Taxonomy articles created by Polbot
Taxobox binomials not recognized by IUCN